The European Confederation of Independent Trade Unions (CESI; French Confédération Européenne des Syndicats Indépendants, German Europäische Union der unabhängigen Gewerkschaften, Italian Confederazione Europea Sindacati Indipendenti) is a regional trade union federation representing around 5 million members of independent trade unions in Europe.

CESI represents free and independent trade unions from the private and public sectors that adhere to democratic principles and defend the respect of human rights.

CESI

Founded in 1990, CESI advocates improved employment conditions for workers in Europe and a strong social dimension in the EU.

CESI’s particular strength lies in the public sector but CESI also represents workers from private sector. Most of CESI’s affiliates are employed in the fields of central, regional and local administration, security and justice, education, training and research, healthcare, postal services and telecommunications, defence and transport.

CESI defends trade union pluralism as a core component of freedom and democracy, views non-partisanship as a guiding principle of its work, and strictly adheres to ethical fundamental principles such as integrity, fairness, incorruptibility and transparency. CESI defends a European social model based on solidarity and subsidiarity and, in its work, strives to maintain the principles of non-discrimination and gender equality. CESI promotes the further development of its own youth organisation and its inclusion in internal decision-making processes.
CESI works in line with the principles of the Charter of Fundamental Rights of the European Union and the Convention for the Protection of Human Rights and Fundamental Freedoms. It defends the principles and aims listed in the Community Charter of Fundamental Social Rights and in the Council of Europe’s European Social Charter.

Composition

Governance

The current President of CESI is Romain Wolff, of the Luxemburgish General Confederation of Civil Servants. Mr Wolff was elected in December 2012 and re-elected at the CESI congress in 2016.
The current Secretary General of CESI is Klaus Heeger. Mr Heeger was elected in December 2012 and re-elected in the 2016 CESI Congress.

Congress takes place once every 4 years. During the CESI Congress, the Presidium and Board are elected. The Presidium and the Board govern CESI during its four-year period. The most recent Congress took place in Brussels in December 2016. Congress also gives member organisations the opportunity to put forward motions for CESI to act upon in its 4-year mandate.

CESI is involved in advocacy work as an interest group and in social dialogue as a recognised European social partner, since 2005. In 2013, the CESI Youth was created for CESI’s young affiliates.

CESI is also composed of a Europe Academy, which it is not only its training branch, but also a point of contact for information on certain elements of social dialogue at the EU level. The Board consists of a President, Vice Presidents and 3 ex-officio members (the President of CESI, the Secretary General and the Treasurer).

Member organisations

The European Confederation of Independent Trade Unions consists of 38 national trade union organisations from 21 European countries and 4 European trade union organisations, with a total of more than 5 million individual members. 2 further trade union organisations enjoy observer status. The largest member organisations come from Germany, France, Spain and Italy.

References
Bibliography

Footnotes

External links

 

 
Trade unions established in 1990
1990 establishments in Europe